Granger is a census-designated place (CDP) in Clay and Harris townships, St. Joseph County, in the U.S. state of Indiana. The population was 30,465 at the 2010 census. Penn-Harris-Madison School Corporation and the South Bend Community School Corporation maintain the public schools in the area.  Granger is part of the South Bend–Mishawaka metropolitan area as well as the larger Michiana region.

History
Granger was founded in 1883, and named after the Grangers fraternal organization. The Granger post office has been in operation since 1875.

Geography
Granger is located at  (41.738320, −86.148777).

Demographics

As of the census of 2000, there were 28,284 people, 9,184 households, and 8,173 families residing in the CDP. The racial makeup of the CDP was 94.15% White, 1.74% African American, 0.12% Native American, 2.63% Asian, 0.02% Pacific Islander, 0.26% from other races, and 1.07% from two or more races. Hispanic or Latino of any race were 1.21% of the population.

There were 9,184 households, out of which 48.1% had children under the age of 18 living with them, 82.7% were married couples living together, 4.7% had a female householder with no husband present, and 11.0% were non-families. 9.1% of all households were made up of individuals, and 3.4% had someone living alone who was 65 years of age or older. The average household size was 3.06 and the average family size was 3.26.

In the CDP, the population was spread out, with 31.7% under the age of 18, 5.2% from 18 to 24, 27.2% from 25 to 44, 27.9% from 45 to 64, and 8.1% who were 65 years of age or older. The median age was 38 years. For every 100 females, there were 97.6 males. For every 100 females age 18 and over, there were 95.9 males.

The median income for a household in the CDP was $80,744, and the median income for a family was $83,171. Males had a median income of $61,255 versus $33,620 for females. The per capita income for the CDP was $31,367. About 1.0% of families and 1.4% of the population were below the poverty line, including 1.4% of those under age 18 and 1.2% of those age 65 or over.

Education
Penn-Harris-Madison School Corporation serves most of Granger.  South Bend Community School Corporation serves students in Clay Township in the western part of Granger. The far eastern tip of Granger located within Elkhart County and not in the CDP, is served by Elkhart Community Schools.

Public schools
The following schools, all of Penn-Harris-Madison lie within the boundaries of Granger:

Discovery Middle School (6-8)
Horizon Elementary School (K-5)
Mary Frank Elementary School (K-5)
Northpoint Elementary School (K-5)
Prairie Vista Elementary School (K-5)
The respective schools serve the majority of the parts of Granger in Penn-Harris-Madison. Elsie Rogers and Walt Disney elementary schools and Schmucker Middle School, outside of Granger, serve other parts of Granger. All residents of the Penn-Harris-Madison district are zoned to Penn High School, which is not in Granger.

The school zoning for the South Bend district portion is as follows (none of these schools are in Granger):
 Darden Elementary School (In 2020: Tarkington Elementary School, which closed in 2021, with most students reassigned to Darden Elementary, and in the 2000s Swanson Elementary School)
 Edison Middle School
 Clay High School and Adams High School serve portions.

Private Schools 
There are also various private schools located in and serving Granger.
Calvary Christian School (K-3)
Granger Christian School (K-12)
Peace Lutheran School (K-8)
St. Pius X Catholic School (K-8)

Public library
Granger has a public library, a branch of the Mishawaka-Penn-Harris Public Library system.

Notable people

 Braxston Cave – football player for the Detroit Lions
 Joe Donnelly – former U.S. Senator
 Michael Dvorak – former Indiana state representative and St. Joseph County, Indiana Prosecutor
 Ken Harrelson – former Major League Baseball player and retired announcer for the Chicago White Sox Major League Baseball Team.
 Ara Parseghian – former head coach at Notre Dame

References

 
Census-designated places in St. Joseph County, Indiana
Census-designated places in Indiana
South Bend – Mishawaka metropolitan area